General elections were held in Monaco on 25 February and 3 March 1963. The elections were the first since the promulgation of a new constitution implemented after Prince Rainier III relinquished his absolute rule over the principality, and the first in which women were permitted to vote. The result was a victory for the National and Democratic Union, which won 17 of the 18 seats in the National Council.

Results
Sixteen seats were won in the first round, with two decided in the second.

References

Elections in Monaco
Monaco
1963 in Monaco
February 1963 events in Europe
March 1963 events in Europe
Election and referendum articles with incomplete results